Caetani is a surname. Notable people with this surname include:

 Caetani, any member of the Italian noble family, closely linked to the papacy

 13-17th century
 Benedetto Caetani, the Pope Boniface VIII (1294-1303)
 Benedetto II Caetani (died 1296), Italian cardinal of the Roman Catholic Church
 Onorato I Caetani (c. 1336–1400), Italian nobleman, Count of Fondi and Great Conestable of the Kingdom of Naples
 Antonio Caetani (seniore) (1360–1412), Italian Roman Catholic cardinal
 Niccolò Caetani (1526–1585), Italian Roman Catholic cardinal and bishop of Conza
 Antonio Caetani (iuniore) (1566–1624), Italian Roman Catholic cardinal
 Bonifazio Caetani (1567–1617), Italian Roman Catholic cardinal
 Enrico Caetani (1550–1599), Italian Cardinal of the Roman Catholic Church
 Camillo Caetani (or Gaetano) (1552–1603), Italian aristocrat and Papal diplomat 
 Luigi Caetani (1595–1642), Italian Cardinal of the Roman Catholic Church
 Francesco Caetani, 8th Duke of Sermoneta (1613–1683), Italian nobleman

 18-21st century
 Onorato Caetani (1742-1797), Italian scholar and Principal of the Accademia degli Incolti, located in Rome 
 Michelangelo Caetani, (1804–1882), Italian scholar, Duke of Sermoneta and Prince of Teano 
 Ersilia Caetani Lovatelli (1840-1912), Italian art historian, cultural historian and archaeologist
 Onorato Caetani (1842–1917), Italian politician 
 Leone Caetani, Duke of Sermoneta (1869–1935), Italian scholar, politician and historian, known also as Prince Caetani
 Gelasio Caetani (1877–1934), Italian nobleman and diplomat 
 Vittoria Colonna Caetani (1880-1954), Italian writer, best known for Memoire (translated Things Past)
 Marguerite Caetani (1840-1963), Princess of Bassiano, American-born publisher, journalist, art collector and patron of the arts
 Sveva Caetani (1917–1994), Italian-Canadian artist
 Oleg Caetani (born 1956), Italian conductor

See also 
 Caetano (disambiguation)
 Gaetani (disambiguation)